Chama Cha Kazi is a political party in Kenya. The party motto “Kazi na Pesa” loosely translates into “Work and Money”.

History 
The party was founded in 2021 by Moses Kuria after he left the People’s Empowerment Party.

In April 2022, the party faced a schism. They contested the 2022 Kenyan general election as part of Kenya Kwanza, and elected one MP. Following his nomination as a cabinet secretary, Kuria started a process of disbanding his party to join the United Democratic Alliance.

References 

Political parties in Kenya
2021 establishments in Kenya
Political parties established in 2021